Defending champion Stefan Edberg defeated Pat Cash in the final, 6–3, 6–4, 3–6, 5–7, 6–3 to win the men's singles tennis title at the 1987 Australian Open.

Seeds
All seeds receive a bye into the second round.

Qualifying

Draw

Finals

Top half

Section 1

Section 2

Section 3

Section 4

Bottom half

Section 5

Section 6

Section 7

Section 8

External links
 Association of Tennis Professionals (ATP) – 1987 Australian Open Men's Singles draw
 1987 Australian Open – Men's draws and results at the International Tennis Federation

Men's Singles
Australian Open (tennis) by year – Men's singles